Eriocapitella tomentosa, a species of flowering plant in the buttercup family Ranunculaceae, is native to Asia. The specific epithet tomentosa means "thickly matted with hairs, tomentum (padding)". In Chinese, a common name is da huo cao (大火草), which means "big fire grass" or "great fireweed".

Taxonomy

Eriocapitella tomentosa was described by Maarten J. M. Christenhusz and James W. Byng in 2018. Like other members of genus Eriocapitella, E. tomentosa was formerly a member of genus Anemone. In particular, the basionym Anemone japonica var. tomentosa Maxim. and the synonym Anemone tomentosa (Maxim.) C.Pei were described in 1889 and 1933, respectively.

Eriocapitella tomentosa is often confused with E.  vitifolia. Indeed, the former was thought to be a variety of the latter for over 100 years. Specifically, the names Anemone vitifolia var. tomentosa (Maxim.) Finet & Gagnep. and Eriocapitella vitifolia var. tomentosa (Maxim.) Nakai, both of which are synonyms of Anemone tomentosa, were described in 1904 and 1941, respectively.

Ecology

Eriocapitella tomentosa along with four other taxa (E. hupehensis, E. japonica, E.  vitifolia, and E. × hybrida) are known as fall-blooming anemones. In its native habitat, E. tomentosa flowers from July to October.

Bibliography

References

External links

 
 

tomentosa
Flora of Asia
Plants described in 2018
Taxa named by Maarten J. M. Christenhusz
Taxa named by James W. Byng